North Carolina's 113th House district is one of 120 districts in the North Carolina House of Representatives. It has been represented by Republican Jake Johnson since 2019.

Geography
Since 2023, the district has included all of Polk County, as well as parts of Henderson, Rutherford, and McDowell counties. The district overlaps with the 46th and 48th Senate districts.

District officeholders since 2003

Election results

2022

2020

2018

2016

2014

2012

2010

2008

2006

2004

2002

References

North Carolina House districts
Polk County, North Carolina
Henderson County, North Carolina
Rutherford County, North Carolina
McDowell County, North Carolina